Tristan Farron-Mahon (born 26 May 1987) is an Irish former professional tennis player.

A native of Dublin, Farron-Mahon relocated to Florida as a child for training and became a top-50 player on the ITF junior circuit. During his junior career he partnered with Marin Čilić in doubles at Wimbledon and the pair won a title together in Roehampton. He was named a National Junior Sports Star by the Irish Examiner for 2005. Due to having a Swiss grandfather, there was purportedly some interest by Switzerland to have him switch allegiances.

Farron-Mahon, who won three ITF Futures doubles titles, made a Davis Cup appearance for Ireland against Finland in Helsini in 2006. He partnered Kevin Sorensen for the doubles rubber, which they lost to Tuomas Ketola and Jarkko Nieminen. In a professional career hampered by injury he attained best rankings of 870 in singles and 501 in doubles.

ITF Futures finals

Doubles: 7 (3–4)

See also
List of Ireland Davis Cup team representatives

References

External links
 
 
 

1987 births
Living people
Irish male tennis players
Tennis players from Dublin (city)
Irish people of Swiss descent